Luau International Airport  is an airport serving Luau, a municipality in the Moxico Province of Angola.

Luau city is on Angolan border with the Democratic Republic of the Congo, and is opposite the DRC city of Dilolo. The airport is part of a transportation plan that includes restoring rail and road linkage with the Katanga Province of the DRC. The airport was opened in February, 2015, by Angolan President, José Eduardo dos Santos.

See also
 List of airports in Angola
 Transport in Angola

References

External links
OpenStreetMap - Luau Intl
AVIC CAPDI - Luau Intl project
WorldFolio - Luau region logistics plan
Luau Airport  Portuguese language video

Airports in Angola
Moxico Province
2015 establishments in Angola